is a 1966 satiric Japanese film directed by Shōhei Imamura. It is based on the novel Erogotoshitachi by Akiyuki Nosaka.

Plot
The Pornographers tells the story of porn filmmaker Mr. Subuyan Ogata, whose business is under threat from thieves, the government, and his own family.

Cast
 Shōichi Ozawa as Subuyan Ogata
 Sumiko Sakamoto as Haru Matsuda
 Keiko Sagawa as Keiko Matsuda, Haru's daughter
 Haruo Tanaka as Banteki
 Nakamura Ganjirō II as Elderly executive from Hakucho Company
 Masaomi Kondō as Kōichi Matsuda, Haru's son
 Akira Nishimura as Detective Sanada
 Ichirō Sugai as Shinun Ogata, Subuyan's father
 Akiji Kobayashi
 Shinichi Nakano as Kabō
 Chōchō Miyako as Virgin House Madame
 Kazuo Kitamura as Doctor

Production and reception
The film is a dark comic satire, depicting the underbelly of the Japanese post-war economic miracle, in this case pornographers and small time gangsters in Osaka. It has been called Imamura's best-known film outside Japan.

Release
The Pornographers was released in Japan in March 1966 where it was distributed by Nikkatsu. It was released in the United States by Toho International with English subtitles in August 1966.

References

External links
 
 
 

1966 films
1966 comedy-drama films
1960s black comedy films
Japanese comedy-drama films
Japanese sex comedy films
Japanese erotic drama films
Films about pornography
Films directed by Shohei Imamura
Films based on Japanese novels
Films set in Osaka
1960s Japanese films